Silicate minerals are rock-forming minerals made up of silicate groups. They are the largest and most important class of minerals and make up approximately 90 percent of Earth's crust.

In mineralogy, silica (silicon dioxide) is usually considered a silicate mineral. Silica is found in nature as the mineral quartz, and its polymorphs.

On Earth, a wide variety of silicate minerals occur in an even wider range of combinations as a result of the processes that have been forming and re-working the crust for billions of years. These processes include partial melting, crystallization, fractionation, metamorphism, weathering, and diagenesis.

Living organisms also contribute to this geologic cycle. For example, a type of plankton known as diatoms construct their exoskeletons ("frustules") from silica extracted from seawater. The frustules of dead diatoms are a major constituent of deep ocean sediment, and of diatomaceous earth.

General structure
A silicate mineral is generally an inorganic compound consisting of subunits with the formula [SiO2+n]2n-.  Although depicted as such, the description of silicates as anions is a simplification.  Balancing the charges of the silicate anions are metal cations, Mx+.  Typical cations are Mg2+, Fe2+, and Na+.  The Si-O-M linkage between the silicates and the metals are strong, polar-covalent bonds.  Silicate anions ([SiO2+n]2n-) are invariably colorless, or when crushed to a fine powder, white.  The colors of silicate minerals arise from the metal component, commonly iron.

In most silicate minerals, silicon is tetrahedral, being surrounded by four oxides.  The coordination number of the oxides is variable except when it bridges two silicon centers, in which case the oxide has a coordination number of two.

Some silicon centers may be replaced by atoms of other elements, still bound to the four corner oxygen corners. If the substituted atom is not normally tetravalent, it usually contributes extra charge to the anion, which then requires extra cations. For example, in the mineral orthoclase , the anion is a tridimensional network of tetrahedra in which all oxygen corners are shared. If all tetrahedra had silicon centers, the anion would be just neutral silica . Replacement of one in every four silicon atoms by an aluminum atom results in the anion , whose charge is neutralized by the potassium cations .

Main groups
In mineralogy, silicate minerals are classified into seven major groups according to the structure of their silicate anion:

Note that tectosilicates can only have additional cations if some of the silicon is replaced by an atom of lower valence such as aluminum. Al for Si substitution is common.

Nesosilicates or orthosilicates

Nesosilicates (from Greek   'island'), or orthosilicates, have the orthosilicate ion, which constitute isolated (insular)  tetrahedra that are connected only by interstitial cations. The Nickel–Strunz classification is 09.A –examples include:

Phenakite group
Phenakite – 
Willemite – 
Olivine group
Forsterite – 
Fayalite – 
Tephroite – 
Garnet group
Pyrope – 
Almandine – 
Spessartine – 
Grossular – 
Andradite – 
Uvarovite – 
Hydrogrossular – 
Zircon group
Zircon – 
Thorite – 
Hafnon – 

 group
Andalusite – 
Kyanite – 
Sillimanite – 
Dumortierite – 
Topaz – 
Staurolite – 
Humite group – 
Norbergite – 
Chondrodite – 
Humite – 
Clinohumite – 
Datolite – 
Titanite – 
Chloritoid – 
Mullite (aka Porcelainite) –

Sorosilicates

Sorosilicates (from Greek   'heap, mound') have isolated pyrosilicate anions , consisting of double tetrahedra with a shared oxygen vertex—a silicon:oxygen ratio of 2:7. The Nickel–Strunz classification is 09.B. Examples include:

Thortveitite – 
Hemimorphite (calamine) – 
Lawsonite – 
Axinite – 
Ilvaite – 
Epidote group (has both  and  groups}
Epidote – 
Zoisite – 
Tanzanite – 
Clinozoisite – 
Allanite – 
Dollaseite-(Ce) – 
Vesuvianite (idocrase) –

Cyclosilicates

Cyclosilicates (from Greek   'circle'), or ring silicates, have three or more tetrahedra linked in a ring. The general formula is (SixO3x)2x−, where one or more silicon atoms can be replaced by other 4-coordinated atom(s). The silicon:oxygen ratio is 1:3. Double rings have the formula (Si2xO5x)2x− or a 2:5 ratio. The Nickel–Strunz classification is 09.C. Possible ring sizes include:

Some example minerals are:
 3-member single ring
 Benitoite – 
 4-member single ring
 Papagoite – .
 6-member single ring
Beryl – 
Bazzite – 
Sugilite – 
Tourmaline – 
Pezzottaite – 
Osumilite – 
Cordierite – 
Sekaninaite – 
 9-member single ring
 Eudialyte – 
 6-member double ring
Milarite – 

Note that the ring in axinite contains two B and four Si tetrahedra and is highly distorted compared to the other 6-member ring cyclosilicates.

Inosilicates

The Nickel–Strunz classification is 09.D – examples include:

Single chain inosilicates
Pyroxene group
Enstatite – orthoferrosilite series
Enstatite – 
Ferrosilite – 
Pigeonite – 
Diopside – hedenbergite series
Diopside – 
Hedenbergite – 
Augite – 
Sodium pyroxene series
Jadeite – 
Aegirine (or acmite) – 
Spodumene – 
Pyroxferroite - 
Pyroxenoid group
Wollastonite – 
Rhodonite – 
Pectolite –

Double chain inosilicates
Amphibole group
Anthophyllite – 
Cummingtonite series
Cummingtonite – 
Grunerite – 
Tremolite series
Tremolite – 
Actinolite – 
Hornblende – 
Sodium amphibole group
Glaucophane – 
Riebeckite (asbestos) – 
Arfvedsonite –

Phyllosilicates

The Nickel–Strunz classification is 09.E. All phyllosilicate minerals are hydrated, with either water or hydroxyl groups attached.

Examples include:
Serpentine subgroup
Antigorite – 
Chrysotile – 
Lizardite – 
Clay minerals group
1:1 clay minerals (TO)
Halloysite – 
Kaolinite – 
2:1 clay minerals (TOT)
Pyrophyllite – 
Talc – 
Illite – 
Montmorillonite (smectite) – 
Chlorite – 
Vermiculite – 
Other clay minerals
Sepiolite – 
Palygorskite (or attapulgite) – 
Mica group
Biotite – 
Fuchsite – 
Muscovite – 
Phlogopite – 
Lepidolite – 
Margarite – 
Glauconite –

Tectosilicates 

This group comprises nearly 75% of the crust of the Earth. Tectosilicates, with the exception of the quartz group, are aluminosilicates. The Nickel–Strunz classifications are 09.F and 09.G, 04.DA (Quartz/ silica family). Examples include:
3D-Silicates, quartz family
Quartz – 
Tridymite – 
Cristobalite – 
Coesite – 
Stishovite – 
Moganite – 
Chalcedony – 
Tectosilicates, feldspar group
Alkali feldspars (potassium feldspars)
Microcline – 
Orthoclase – 
Anorthoclase – 
Sanidine – 
Plagioclase feldspars
Albite – 
Oligoclase –      (Na:Ca 4:1)
Andesine –      (Na:Ca 3:2)
Labradorite –      (Na:Ca 2:3)
Bytownite –      (Na:Ca 1:4)
Anorthite – 
Tectosilicates, feldspathoid family
Nosean – 
Cancrinite –
Leucite – 
Nepheline – 
Sodalite – 
Hauyne – 
Lazurite – 
Tectosilicates, scapolite group
Marialite – 
Meionite – 
Tectosilicates, zeolite family
Natrolite – 
Erionite – 
Chabazite – 
Heulandite – 
Stilbite – 
Scolecite – 
Mordenite – 
Analcime –

See also

References

External links

 Mindat.org, Dana classification
 Webmineral : Dana's New Silicate Classification

 

ja:ケイ酸塩鉱物
pl:Krzemiany